Shape of Things to Come is the first and only album released by Max Frost and the Troopers. It was produced in 1968 by Mike Curb, Ed Beram, and Harley Hatcher (engineer) and directed by Rick Stephens for Sidewalk Productions and released on Tower Records.

The back cover of the album contains the following quotation:
"All things that have gone before are but the bleak, cold grayness of the early dawn... listen! Beyond the far edge of the world, the first yellow rays of sunlight are flooding toward us like the tide. Youth everywhere is ready to awake. Man stands poised to spring up from the Earth and thrust himself out, out, laughing, to stake a bright new homeland amid the stars!"
 -- Angus Scrimm (Puket '83)

A brief review in Billboard highlighted several tracks and suggested that the album would be a commercial success like the single, which peaked at 22 on the Billboard Hot 100 on September 28, 1968.

Shape of Things to Come was re-released by Captain High in 2014 with bonus tracks.

Track listing
Side one
"Shape of Things to Come" (Barry Mann and Cynthia Weil) – 1:55
"Lonely Man" (Paul Wibier) – 2:32
"Shine It On" (Wibier) – 2:29
"It's Wrong" (Barney Hector and Wibier) – 2:12
"Captain Hassel" (Dale Beckner, Hector, Stewart Martin, Gary McClain, and Wibier) – 2:21

Side two
"Fifty Two Per Cent" (Mann and Weil) – 2:41
"Try to Make Up Your Mind" (Wibier) – 1:55
"Let Your Mind Run Free" (Wibier) – 2:31
"She Lied" (Beckner and Martin) – 2:36
"A Change Is Gonna Come" (Beckner and Wibier) – 2:38

Bonus tracks on 2014 re-release from Captain High
"Love to Be Your Man"– 2:12
"Free Lovin'"– 2:19
"Psychedelic Senate"– 2:16
"Fourteen or Fight"– 2:48
"Wild in the Streets"– 2:45
"Listen to the Music"– 2:50
"Sally LeRoy"– 2:40
"Shelly in Camp"– 1:41
"Paxton Quigley's Had the Course"– 2:00

Personnel
Max Frost and the Troopers
Paul Wibier

Technical personnel
Eddie Beram– production
Mike Curb– production
The Edric Agency– supervision
Harley Hatcher– engineering, production
Drew Struzan– cover

References

External links

1968 debut albums
Albums produced by Mike Curb
Albums with cover art by Drew Struzan
Max Frost and the Troopers albums
Tower Records albums